The Huntsville Springers were a Minor League Baseball team based in Huntsville, Alabama, that played in the Georgia–Alabama League in 1930.

External links
Baseball Reference

Baseball teams established in 1930
Baseball teams disestablished in 1930
Defunct minor league baseball teams
Professional baseball teams in Alabama
Defunct Georgia-Alabama League teams
1930 establishments in Alabama
1930 disestablishments in Alabama
Sports in Huntsville, Alabama
Defunct baseball teams in Alabama